The inconspicuous barb (Enteromius innocens), sometimes misspelled  barb, is a species of cyprinid fish. It is found in Burundi, Kenya, Malawi, and Tanzania. Its natural habitats are rivers, freshwater lakes, freshwater marshes, and inland deltas. It is not considered a threatened species by the IUCN.

References

Enteromius
Cyprinid fish of Africa
Fish described in 1896
Taxa named by Georg Johann Pfeffer
Taxonomy articles created by Polbot